Kapur an Indian surname of Punjabi origin. Notable people with the surname include:

People with surname Kapur
 Aditya Roy Kapur (born 1985), Indian actor
 Akash Kapur (born 1974), Indian-American journalist
 Akhil Kapur (born 1985), Indian actor
 Amit Kapur (entrepreneur), American internet entrepreneur 
 Anita Kapur, chairperson of the Central Board of Direct Taxes of India
 Anuja Trehan Kapur (born 1975), Indian criminal psychologist and social activist
 Ayesha Kapur (born 1994), Indian actress
 Devesh Kapur, professor of political science at the University of Pennsylvania
 Gaurav Kapur, Indian actor
 Geeta Kapur, Indian art critic and art historian
 H.L. Kapur, Lieutenant Governor of Delhi
 J.K. Kapur (1927–2004), Indian film producer, activist, and restaurateur
 Jagdish Chandra Kapur (1920–2010), Indian social scientist and entrepreneur
 Kunaal Roy Kapur, Indian actor and director
 Kunal Kapur (born 1979), Indian celebrity chef and restaurateur
 Manju Kapur, Indian novelist
 Mudassar Kapur (born 1976), Norwegian politician
 Nawab Kapur Singh (1697–1753), 18th-century Sikh leader
 Neha Kapur (born 1984), Miss India Universe 2006
 Pankaj Kapur (born 1954), Indian actor
 Pradeep Kumar Kapur (born 1954), career Indian Foreign Service officer
 Rajit Kapur (born 1960), Indian actor
 Raman Kapur, Indian medical acupuncturist
 Shekhar Kapur (born 1945), Indian film director and producer
 Shitij Kapur, dean at the Institute of Psychiatry, Psychology and Neuroscience at King's College London
 Shiv Kapur (born 1982), Indian golfer
 Siddharth Roy Kapur (born 1974), CEO of Disney India
 Yashpal Kapur (1929–1993), leader of the Indian National Congress and aide to Indira Gandhi

See also
Kapoor